Kal-e Naqd Ali (also Romanized as Kal-e Naqd ‘Alī) is a village in Dehdez Rural District, Dehdez District, Izeh County, Khuzestan Province, Iran. At the 2006 census, its population was 119, in 26 families.

References 

Populated places in Izeh County